Tropical Storm Chris caused minor flooding along the Gulf Coast of the United States in September 1982. The fifth tropical or subtropical cyclone and third named storm of the 1982 Atlantic hurricane season, Chris developed from a surface low-pressure area in the northern Gulf of Mexico on September 9. Although initially displaying subtropical characteristics, the low pressure area gradually acquired tropical characteristics, and was reclassified as Tropical Depression Four within 24 hours of development. The depression then began to intensify and was upgraded to Tropical Storm Chris on September 10. Thereafter, the storm turned north-north-eastward and strengthened further. On September 11, Chris peaked as a 65 mph (100 km/h) tropical storm. Later that day, it made landfall near Sabine Pass, Port Arthur, Texas. By September 13, Chris dissipated over Arkansas.

When Chris moved ashore, it caused high waves and tides along the shores of the Gulf of Mexico. Though the storm made landfall in Texas, minimal impact was recorded in that state, though a restaurant suffered significant damage. Much of the impact occurred to the east, in Louisiana. The storm caused steady rainfall in parts of the Midwestern United States. Due to minor flooding, damage in Louisiana was around $1 million (1982 USD). Elsewhere, the impact was limited to mostly light to moderate rainfall, though local flooding was reported in Tennessee and Kentucky. Overall, Chris caused $2 million (1982 USD) in damage and no fatalities.

Meteorological history

An upper-low pressure system formed in the Gulf of Mexico on September 6, with the circulation heading westward. Initially, minimal development occurred, though by September 8, the system became a surface low. It is estimated that the surface low became a subtropical depression by 0000 UTC on the following day. Over the next 24 hours, the low began acquiring tropical characteristics, mainly from developing deep convection on its north and east sides. By early on September 10, observations from oil rigs, radars, and Air Force reconnaissance flights indicated that the subtropical system had transitioned into Tropical Depression Four. However, the National Hurricane Center did not operationally issue advisories until 1900 UTC on September 10, at which time Chris was already a tropical storm.

In post-season analysis, it was indicated that Tropical Depression Five strengthened into Tropical Storm Chris at 1200 UTC on September 10. Due to a large low pressure trough over the Southwestern United States, Chris immediately curved northward. Later that day, the National Hurricane Center noted that "even though conditions do not favor rapid strengthening...winds could approach hurricane force before the center moves inland Saturday". As it approached closer to the Gulf Coast of the United States, Chris curved slightly east of north. Shortly before 1200 UTC, Chris made landfall near Sabine Pass, Port Arthur, Texas, with winds of 65 mph (100 km/h). Chris weakened quickly, and was downgraded to a tropical depression by early on September 12 while centered over west-central Louisiana. The storm deteriorated further, and dissipated in Arkansas at 0000 UTC on September 13. The remnants were last noted over the Midwestern United States.

Preparations
As Chris approached the Gulf Coast, at least 6,500 people were evacuated from the Louisiana coast. Offshore evacuations were also completed, with many oil rig workers were taken off of rigs in the Gulf of Mexico.

Along with the evacuations, multiple watches and warnings were issued in accordance with Tropical Storm Chris. The first was on September 9, when a gale warning was released for the Louisiana area east of Port Arthur, Texas. Fifteen hours afterwards, a gale warning was released for Port Arthur to Port O'Connor, Texas. The next day, the gale warnings in Texas were extended as far south as Brownsville. A hurricane watch was released at 2200 UTC on September 10 for Morgan City, Louisiana to Port O'Connor, Texas. All watches and warnings were discontinued by 2200 UTC on September 11, which was about 10 hours after Chris made landfall.

Impact

In addition, several boats in the Gulf of Mexico sustained heavy damage. Winds were light, remaining below tropical storm force in eastern Texas. However, a restaurant on Pleasure Island suffered an estimated $200,000 in damage (1982 USD). In addition, minimal damage occurred at Sea Rim State Park, totaling to only $1,000 (1982 USD). In the Port Arthur area, numerous power outages were reported. Flooded roads and power outages were reported in Beaumont, though damage was not significant in that city.

On land, Chris produced tropical storm force winds in a few areas and light to moderate rainfall. Street flooding in Lake Charles was severe, though only a few houses suffered flood damage. To the south of Lake Charles, minor damage was reported in Cameron Parish, totaling to about $500,000 (1982 USD). However, due to high tides, damage along the coastal areas of that parish was considerable. A Cameron Parish official noted, "There's power out all over the place, and we understand there was quite a bit of damage at Holly Beach". In Evangeline Parish, an F2 tornado on the Fujita Scale destroyed four buildings and damaged seven other structures. In northeastern Louisiana, wind damage was "spotty" and limited to downed trees and powerlines. As a result of heavy rainfall in that portion of the state, low-lying areas flooded and bayous overflowed. A tornado, rated at F3, destroyed eleven houses and one church in Clayton. In addition, the tornado knocked down trees and powerlines in the area. Overall, damage in Louisiana was near $1 million (1982 USD).

Throughout Louisiana and Mississippi, a combined total of nine tornadoes was reported. One of the tornadoes in Mississippi damaged several homes and businesses in Cleveland, and at least four injuries were reported. Another tornado spawned in a rural area overturned a mobile home in Eden. Two other twisters in the state caused minimal damage. Precipitation was also recorded in Lake Okeechobee, with  reported there. The northeastern section of the state reported  of rain. No rain was reported in the Florida Keys.

In Arkansas, only  of rain was reported, which was in several portions of the state. Other rains in the state include , which was widespread. Very little rain was reported in Indiana, with only  on the southern border of the state. The western portions of Tennessee reported flood waters at least waist high in some city streets. In addition, schools in Milan were closed, while portions of U.S. Routes 70 and 79 were submerged into water. A few businesses in the city of Huntington suffered flood damage. Other rains include  in the Carolinas, New York, Michigan, Virginia and Ohio. Overall, damage from Tropical Storm Chris was slightly less than $2 million (1982 USD), and no fatalities were reported.

See also

Other storms of the same name

References

External links
 Monthly Weather Review
 Detailed information on all storms from 1982
 Poststorm Reconnaissance of Tropical Storm Chris

1982 Atlantic hurricane season
Atlantic tropical storms
Hurricanes in Louisiana
Hurricanes in Tennessee
Hurricanes in Arkansas
Hurricanes in Florida
Chris